is a song by Chara. It debuted at #24 on the Japanese Oricon album charts, and charted for five weeks. The song was used in commercials for the NEC brand 'Foma N702iS' cellphone.

Chara wrote the song in 2005. The main guitar chords in the song were recycled from the song  from her 2005 independently released album Something Blue.

She wrote  in the style of Stevie Nicks. The B-side  is a cover of Akiko Kosaka's 1973 debut single.

Music video

The music video was shot by director . It begins with an animated/CGI image of an egg that cracks becomes a bird. This bird flies off past several doors, and enters one into a space scene. The scene switches to Chara in an almost completely white room with a white dress. She wears her hair half-straight and half in an afro (with the division being vertically down the centre of her head). The scene switches to a drawing a Chara falling through a dark, psychedelic scene, followed by a white-backed scene depicting different drawings. Chara returns to the white room, however with a different hair-style and now drawn animals floating around her. Occasionally the originally dressed Chara appears behind her. The video ends with more psychedelic scenes and the bird flying away into space/clouds.

Track listing

Single

Chart Rankings

Oricon Charts (Japan)

References

Chara (singer) songs
2006 singles
Japanese-language songs
2006 songs
Songs written by Chara (singer)
Universal Music Japan singles